Keith Kulinga (born 14 April 1979) is a Zimbabwean cricketer. He played four first-class matches for Southern Rocks between 2009 and 2011.

References

External links
 

1979 births
Living people
Zimbabwean cricketers
Mashonaland cricketers
Southern Rocks cricketers
Sportspeople from Harare